Digama is a genus of moths in the family Erebidae described by Frederic Moore in 1858. It is distributed in South Africa, China, throughout India, Sri Lanka, Myanmar and Australia.

Taxonomy
The genus was formerly placed in the Arctiidae and the Noctuidae by different authors.

Description
Palpi upturned with second joint reaching vertex of head and long third joint. Forewings square and rather short. Vein 5 from just above lower angle of cell. Vein 6 from just below the upper angle. Veins 7 and 10 from a short areole. Hindwings with vein 5 from above lower angle of cell. Veins 6 and 7 are stalked.

Species

Digama abietis Leech, 1889
Digama africana Swinhoe, 1907
Digama aganais Felder, 1874
Digama budonga Bethume-Baker, 1913
Digama burmana Hampson, 1892
Digama costimacula Swinhoe, 1907
Digama culta Hübner, 1825
Digama daressalamica Strand, 1911
Digama fasciata Butler, 1877
Digama hearseyana Moore, 1859
Digama insulana Felder, 1868
Digama lithosioides Swinhoe, 1907
Digama malgassica Toulgoët, 1954
Digama marchalii Guerin, 1843
Digama marmorea Butler, 1877
Digama meridionalis Swinhoe, 1907
Digama ostentata Distant, 1899
Digama pandaensis Romieux, 1935
Digama plicata Pinhey, 1952
Digama rileyi Kiriakoff, 1958
Digama sagittata Gaede, 1926
Digama septempuncta Hampson, 1910
Digama serratula Talbot, 1932
Digama sinuosa Hampson, 1905
Digama spilosoma Felder, 1874
Digama spilosomoides Walker, 1865
Digama strabonis Hampson, 1910

References

Digama at the Natural History Museum Butterflies and Moths of the World project

Aganainae
Moth genera